The National Society of New England Women is a lineage society whose members are women with an ancestor born in New England before 1789 or in the Nassau or Suffolk counties of Long Island before 1700.

The society was founded by Mrs. William Gerry Slade in 1895.  It met at the Waldorf Astoria New York and established branches elsewhere which were organised as colonies.  For example, a colony was established in Madison, Wisconsin in 1930. The organization had at the time 55 colonies with a total membership of over three thousand.

The colonies engage in educational works with a patriotic theme such as sponsoring essay contests, pageants, scholarships and support of libraries.

References 

1895 establishments in New York City
Organizations established in 1895
History of women in the United States
Lineage societies
Women's clubs in the United States
New England